The IEEE Internet of Things Journal is a bimonthly peer-reviewed scientific journal published by the IEEE on behalf of the IEEE Sensors Council, IEEE Communications Society, IEEE Computer Society, and IEEE Signal Processing Society. It covers research on the Internet of things. The journal was established in 2004 and the editor-in-chief is Honggang Wang (University of Massachusetts Dartmouth).

Abstracting and indexing
The journal is abstracted and indexed in:

According to the Journal Citation Reports, the journal has a 2020 impact factor of 9.936.

References

External links

Engineering journals
IEEE academic journals
English-language journals
Bimonthly journals
Publications established in 2014